Sandungen is the name of two lakes in Nordmarka in Oslo, Norway. Store Sandungen has an area of 2.9 km², and the nearby Vesle Sandungen covers 1.4 km².

References

Lakes of Oslo